An arrow is a projectile launched from a bow.

Arrow or arrows may also refer to:

Symbols 
 Arrow (symbol)
 ↑ (disambiguation)
 → (disambiguation)
 ↓ (disambiguation)
 ← (disambiguation)

Places 
 Arrow, Kentucky
 Arrow, Warwickshire, England
 Arrow River (New Zealand)
 River Arrow, Wales
 River Arrow, Worcestershire, England

People 
 Arrow (musician) (1949–2010), calypso and soca musician
 Gilbert John Arrow (1873–1948), English entomologist
 Kenneth Arrow (1921–2017), American economist, joint winner of the 1972 Nobel Prize in Economics

Arts, entertainment, and media

Fictional entities
 Arrow (comics), a superhero character, first appearing in 1938
 The Arrow, a fictional location, the first Dharma Initiative station in the television series Lost
Arrow, a character from Rudolph the Red-Nosed Reindeer: The Movie.

Music

Groups and labels
 Arrows (Australian band), indie rock band established 2006
 Arrows (British band), 1970s Anglo-American glam rock-pop band
 Delphian Complex, UK alternative band now known as Arrows
 The Arrow (band), Russian heavy metal band
 The Arrows (Canadian band), a 1980s new wave band
 The Arrows, a South African indie rock band
 The Arrows, the backing group of guitarist Davie Allan

Albums
 Arrow (Heartless Bastards album), 2012
 Arrows (Stonegard album), 2006
 Arrows (The Lonely Forest album), 2011

Songs
 "Arrow" (Gackt song), 2015
 "Arrow", a song by Candlebox from their eponymous debut album Candlebox
 "Arrows" (song), 2014 song by Fences featuring Macklemore and produced by Ryan Lewis
 "Arrows", a song by Fireworks from their 2011 album Gospel

Periodicals
 The Arrow (newspaper), an Australian newspaper published between 1896 and 1933
 The Arrow, a British newsletter in the 1930s, edited in 1939 by Frederick Augustus Voigt

Radio 
 Arrow (radio format), playing 1970s era classic rock
 90.7 Arrow Jazz FM, Dutch jazz radio station
 94.5 The Arrow, Florida radio station, see WARO
 91.9 The Arrow, New York radio station, see WSHR
 Arrow Classic Rock, Dutch rock radio station
 Arrow FM (Hastings), UK
 The Arrow (radio), a former digital radio station in the United Kingdom

Television 
 Arrow (TV series), a 2012 television series about the fictional comic book superhero, Green Arrow
 Arrows (TV series), the Arrows pop band's 1976-7 weekly ITV TV series
 The Arrow (miniseries), a 1996 Canadian television miniseries
 "Arrow" (Smallville), an episode of the TV series Smallville

Other uses in arts, entertainment, and media
 Arrow Books, an imprint of Random House
 War of the Arrows, or Arrow: The Ultimate Weapon, a 2011 South Korean film

Brands and enterprises 
 Arrow (liqueur), a brand of alcoholic beverage
 Arrow (motorcycle part manufacturer), Arrow Special Parts, an Italian motorcycle exhaust manufacturer
 Arrow, a brand of shirts and collars made notable in the early 20th century in ads with The Arrow Collar Man
 Arrow Air, airline
 Arrow Aircraft and Motors, an American aircraft manufacturer of the 1920s and 1930s
 Arrow Aircraft Ltd., a British aircraft manufacturer of the 1930s                  
 Arrow Dynamics, an American roller coaster manufacturer, extant 1943–2002
 Arrow Electronics, an American electronics company founded in 1935
 Arrow Films, an independent UK film distributor
 Arrow Film Corporation, a US silent film studio
 Arrow SNC, an Italian aircraft engine manufacturer
 Arrow Supermarkets, an Australian supermarket chain, extant until the early 1990s

Computing
 Arrow (computer science), a more general interface to computation than monads
 Arrows (Unicode block), a Unicode block containing line, curve, and semicircle symbols terminating in barbs or arrows

Physics 
 Arrow of time, a physics concept
 ARROW waveguide, an anti-resonant reflecting optical waveguide

Transportation

Aircraft 
 Avro Arrow, a prototype Canadian supersonic fighter-interceptor cancelled in 1959
 FreeX Arrow, a German paraglider design
 Dornier Do 335, an experimental Nazi heavy fighter
 Piper PA-28, "Arrow", a retractable gear variant of the Piper Aircraft PA-28 "Cherokee"
 Spartan Arrow, a 1930s British biplane
 Thorp Arrow, an American light aircraft design

Automobiles 
 Whitmore Arrow, a 1914 cyclecar from Detroit, Michigan
 Arrows Grand Prix International, a former Formula One racing team
 Rootes Arrow, a range of cars from the British Rootes Group from 1967 to 1976, commonest being the Hillman Hunter
 Pierce-Arrow, an American automobile
 Plymouth Arrow, a Chrysler import, 1976–1980
 Project Arrow, a Canadian electric vehicle project

Missiles and rockets 
 Arrow (Israeli missile), an Israeli anti-ballistic missile system
 Arrow (Russian missile), an air-to-air missile
 "Arrow" or Strela (rocket), Russian orbital launch rocket

Rail 
 Amtrak Arrow Reservation System, used by Amtrak employees for passenger train reservations
 Arrow (rail line), a commuter rail line in San Bernardino County, California, United States
 Arrow (MILW train), an American Midwestern route that ran until the mid-1960s
 Arrow (railcar), a railroad car of the Pennsylvania Railroad
 IE 2600 Class, also known as Arrow, a railcar of Irish Rail
 IE 2700 Class, also known as Arrows, a railroad car of Iarnród Éireann

Ships 
 Arrow (barque), built in 1902 for the Anglo-American Oil Co Ltd.
 Arrow, a New Zealand company sailing ship, the first enter Nelson Harbour, New Zealand
 Arrow, a Chinese-owned lorcha, whose detainment triggered the Second Opium War
 The Arrow Incident, a diplomatic crisis in 1856 that led to the Arrow War, better known as the Second Opium War
 HMS Arrow, seven ships of the British Royal Navy and one of the Royal Australian Navy
 , a Seatruck Ferries ship

Mathematics 
 Arrow, the lower limit topology on the real line
 Arrow, representing a morphism, linking objects in category theory

Other uses 
 Arrow information paradox, on trading information
 Arrow's impossibility theorem, on voting systems
 The arrow paradox, one of Zeno's paradoxes
 Arrow declaration, in UK patent litigation

See also 
 Arrow Creek (disambiguation)
 Arrow Lake (disambiguation)
 Arrow River (disambiguation)
 Arrowtown, New Zealand
 Black Arrow (disambiguation)
 Blue Arrow (disambiguation)
 Dan Henry (1913–2012), another name for unique directional arrows for cycling routes
 Golden Arrow (disambiguation)
 Green Arrow (disambiguation)
 Green Arrows
 Pink Arrow (disambiguation)
 Red Arrow (disambiguation)
 River Arrow (disambiguation)
 Silver Arrow (disambiguation)
 White Arrow (disambiguation)
 Yellow Arrow (disambiguation)